Epicedia maculatrix is a species of beetle in the family Cerambycidae. It was described by Perty in 1831. It is known from Java, Borneo, Thailand, and Sumatra.

References

Lamiini
Beetles described in 1831